Fisher is an archaic term for a fisherman, revived as gender-neutral.

Fisher, Fishers or The Fisher may also refer to:

Places

Australia
Division of Fisher, an electoral district in the Australian House of Representatives, in Queensland
Electoral district of Fisher, a state electoral district in South Australia
Fisher, Australian Capital Territory
Fisher, Queensland, a suburb in the City of Mount Isa
Fisher, South Australia, a locality
Hundred of Fisher, a cadastral unit in South Australia

Canada
Rural Municipality of Fisher
Fisher (electoral district), a former provincial electoral division in Manitoba, Canada

United Kingdom
Fisher Bank, a sea area of the UK shipping forecast

United States
Fisher, Arkansas
Fisher, California (disambiguation), multiple locations
Fisher, Illinois
Fisher, Louisiana
Fisher, Minnesota
Fisher, Missouri
Fisher, Oregon, an unincorporated community
Fisher, Pennsylvania
Fisher, West Virginia, an unincorporated community
Fisher Island, Florida
Fishers, Indiana
Fishers, New York
Fishers Island, New York

Archaeological sites
Fisher site, an archaeological site in Greene County, Pennsylvania
Fisher Farm site, an archaeological site in the Centre County, Pennsylvania

Law
Fisher v. University of Texas (2013), a 2013 Supreme Court case
Fisher v. University of Texas (2016), a 2016 Supreme Court case

Organizations
Fisher Body, a former automobile coachbuilder
Max M. Fisher College of Business, part of the Ohio State University
Fisher Communications
Fisher F.C., a football club in England
Fisher Electronics, a Sanyo subsidiary producing hi-fi equipment
The Fisher (electronics manufacturer), a line of electronics marketed by Avery Fisher and predecessor to Fisher Electronics
Fisher House Foundation, an organization funding the construction of family lodging facilities near military hospitals

People
Fisher (surname), an English surname
Fisher (musician), Australian house music producer
Fisher Ames (1758–1808), American politician
Fisher Stevens (born 1963), American actor, director, producer and writer
Sergey Golovkin (1959–1996), Russian serial killer known as "The Fisher"

Science and mathematics
Fisher meteorite of 1894, which landed in Minnesota, United States (see meteorite falls)
Fisher's exact test, a statistical significance test
Fisher's method, also known as Fisher's combined probability test
Fisher equation, an equation in financial mathematics and economics
Fisher transformation, a transformation in statistics used to test some hypotheses

Other uses
Fisher (animal) (Pekania pennanti), a North American mustelid
Fisher (band), a rock band featuring Kathy Fisher as lead singer
Fisher (comic strip), a Canadian comic strip by Philip Street
Fisher (yachts), motorsailers first built in the 1970s

See also
Fisher Island (disambiguation)
Fisherman (disambiguation)
Fishery

Kingfisher